The Bikaner State Railway (BkSR) was formed in 1924 and took over responsibility for working the Bikaner section of the Jodhpur–Bikaner Railway.

History 
Earlier named the Jodhpur Railway the first section opened as a metre gauge line in 1882, later becoming the Jodhpur–Bikaner Railway (JBR) in 1889. In 1908 the JBR operated  in the territories of Sind (under British control) and in territories of the States of Jodhpur and Bikaner. A further  were sanctioned or under construction by JBR in 1918.

In 1924, the JBR was divided into its two constituent parts, with two new systems, the Jodhpur State Railway (JSR) and Bikaner State Railway (BkSR)  formed to take over responsibility for working the railway. By 1943 the BkSR was operating a network of 

In 1947, the British section of the Jodhpur-Hyderabad Railway and the western portions of Jodhpur State Railway and Bikaner State Railway was ceded to the government of Pakistan becoming part of Pakistan Railways. The remaining portions of the Jodhpur State Railway and Bikaner State Railway became part of the Northern Division of Indian Railways in 1952.

Rolling stock
In 1936, the company owned 54 locomotives, 187 coaches and 325 goods wagons.

Classification
It was labeled as a Class II railway according to Indian Railway Classification System of 1926. Later, it was classified as Class I.

Conversion to broad gauge
The network was converted to  broad gauge progressively in the 2000s and 2010s.

References 

Transport in Bikaner
Defunct railway companies of India
Metre gauge railways in India
Rail transport in Rajasthan
History of Rajasthan